"Dancing" was the fourth single released in Italy and the United States from Elisa's third album, Then Comes the Sun, and the first single released from her American album Dancing.

Track listings
US EP
"Dancing" – 5:36
"Dancing" (live from London iTunes Festival) – 5:36
"Rock Your Soul" – 5:03

Trivia
In 2006, the song was used as the solo music for Jessica Fernandez on the hit show So You Think You Can Dance when she placed in the bottom three.
In 2007, it was again used in So You Think You Can Dance, first by Jaimie Goodwin as her audition song in New York and second on the Top 20 show danced to by Lacey Schwimmer and Kameron Bink and choreographed by Mia Michaels, both in the third season.
In 2008, Kelli Baker used it as her audition song in Utah for the fourth season of So You Think You Can Dance.
In the 2012 dance film Step Up Revolution, a scene includes the protagonist Emily (Kathryn McCormick) dancing to this song to audition for a contemporary dance company headed by Olivia Brown (Mia Michaels).

Chart performance

References

2002 singles
2007 singles
Elisa (Italian singer) songs
Songs written by Elisa (Italian singer)
Rock ballads
Pop ballads
English-language Italian songs
2002 songs
Sugar Music singles